The 1996 3 Nations Cup was a women's ice hockey tournament held various locations of Ontario and Canton, New York, from October 20–27, 1996. It was the first edition of the 3 Nations Cup.

Rosters

Results

Preliminary round

Gold medal game

Statistics

Final standings

Scoring leaders
Only the top ten skaters, sorted by points, then goals, are included in this list.

Source: Hockey Canada

Goaltending leaders
The four goaltenders, based on goals against average, who played at least 40% of their team's minutes, are included in this list.

Source: Hockey Canada

External links
Tournament on WHockey.com

1996
1996–97 in American women's ice hockey
1996–97 in Canadian women's ice hockey
1996–97 in Finnish ice hockey
1996–97 in women's ice hockey
1996
1996
1996
1996
1996
1996
1996
October 1996 sports events in North America
1996 in sports in New York (state)
1996 in Ontario
October 1996 sports events in North America
Ice hockey competitions in New York (state)
Smiths Falls